Rear-Admiral Sir Arthur Rullion Rattray,  (2 May 1891 – 10 August 1966) was a British naval officer who served in the Royal Indian Marine and was an air observer during World War I. He rose to senior rank in the Royal Indian Navy during World War II.

Early life
Rattray was born in Gatehouse of Fleet, Scotland, the fourth of five children born to Arthur Rattray, a retired Indian Civil Servant and judge, and his wife Mary Louise Wakely (née Sutherland). His parents had returned from Bengal, where their first three children were born, in around 1889.

He then trained at HMS Ganges, near Ipswich, before serving in the Merchant Service, working for the Aberdeen-based shipping company of George Milne & Co., until joining the Royal Indian Marine (RIM) in 1912.

First World War
Rattray continued to serve in the RIM after the outbreak of World War I, but on 15 February 1917 he was appointed a temporary lieutenant on the General List as a flying officer (observer), with seniority from 7 November 1916, but without prior pay or allowances. He transferred to the Royal Flying Corps from the Royal Naval Air Service on 6 November 1916 becoming a member of the RNAS attached to No. 30 Squadron flying the BE2c. in Mesopotamia for reconnaissance. He received a mention in despatches following a recommendation from the Commander-in-Chief, Lieutenant-General Sir Stanley Maude, on 15 August 1917.

In 1917, he was flying in a BE 2c as an observer on a low-level bombing attack. His aircraft was hit by ground fire, and Rattray was wounded in the leg. Service records state that he transferred back to the Royal Navy undertaking minesweeping duties at Ramsgate, in January 1918.

Rattray transferred back to the Royal Indian Marine on 17 November 1920 after sixteen months leave. The Royal Indian Marine became the Royal Indian Navy in 1934. On 26 December 1934, he was promoted from lieutenant commander to commander.

Second World War
Promoted to captain on 5 April 1940. By the time he was made a Companion of the Order of the Indian Empire on 1 January 1943, he was serving as a commodore, and by 14 June 1945, when he was made a Companion of the Order of the Bath, had been promoted to rear-admiral. He was serving as Flag Officer, Bombay, during the 1946 mutiny. Rattray was made a Knight Commander of the Order of the British Empire on 1 January 1948, two weeks before his retirement on 13 January.

Family life
Rattray married Doris Gertrude Muir in 1917 and they had one son. Rattray died at his home in Camberley, Surrey, on 10 August 1966.

References

1891 births
1966 deaths
People from Dumfries and Galloway
Royal Flying Corps officers
Royal Air Force personnel of World War I
British World War I flying aces
Scottish flying aces
Royal Indian Navy admirals
Companions of the Order of the Indian Empire
Companions of the Order of the Bath
Knights Commander of the Order of the British Empire